Redemolished is a collection of short stories, interviews, and other articles and essays by science fiction author Alfred Bester.  Published in 2000 (thirteen years after Bester's death) by iBooks, inc, edited by Richard Raucci.

Redemolished contains the short stories:
 "The Probable Man"
 "Hell Is Forever"
 "The Push of a Finger"
 "The Roller Coaster"
 "The Lost Child"
 "I'll Never Celebrate New Year's Again"
 "Out of This World"
 "The Animal Fair"
 "Something Up There Likes Me"
 "The Four-Hour Fugue"
It also contains three fictional articles published in Holiday Magazine:
 "Gourmet Dining in Outer Space"
 "Place of the Month: The Moon"
 "The Sun"
and four essays:
 "Science Fiction and the Renaissance Man", originally delivered as a lecture at the University of Chicago in 1957.  The other lecturers included Cyril Kornbluth, Robert A. Heinlein, and Robert Bloch.
 "A Diatribe Against Science Fiction"
 "The Perfect Composite Science Fiction Author"
 "My Affair with Science Fiction"

Also included are interviews with John Huston and Rex Stout, a conversation with Woody Allen, brief articles on Isaac Asimov and Robert A. Heinlein, two deleted prologues and an analysis of The Demolished Man, and a memorial for Bester written by Isaac Asimov, with an introduction by Gregory S. Benford.

2000 short story collections
Short story collections by Alfred Bester